American rapper T.I. has released many music videos, working with various directors. He has also been featured in several music videos for other prominent recording artists. T.I.'s first solo music video was for his debut single "I'm Serious", released in 2001 and directed by American music video director Chris Robinson. T.I's first lead role was in his first featured film, ATL, which was also directed by Chris Robinson.

Albums

Music video albums

Music videos

As lead artist

As featured artist

As director

Filmography

See also
 T.I. discography
 List of awards and nominations received by T.I.
 P$C discography

References

Videography
Videographies of American artists
Male actor filmographies
American filmographies